Sérgio Groisman, best known as Serginho Groisman ( born June 29, 1950), is a Brazilian television presenter and journalist. He is the host of the talk shows Altas Horas on Rede Globo and Tempos de Escola on Canal Futura.

Personal life 
Serginho is Jewish. His father was from Romania, and his mother was born in 
Poland. His great-grandparents and some of his aunts died in a Nazi concentration camp.

References 

1950 births
Living people
People from São Paulo
Brazilian people of Polish-Jewish descent
Brazilian people of Romanian-Jewish descent
Brazilian journalists
Male journalists
Brazilian television presenters
Brazilian Jews